Gandipalem is a small village in Nellore District in Andhra Pradesh, India.

Demography and culture
The Gandipalem village has population of 3481 with total 865 families of which 1800 are males while 1681 are females as per Census 2011.  The average human sex ratio is 934. The Child Sex Ratio is 980. The Male literacy rate is 83.44% while female literacy rate is 56.70% and combined literacy is 70.57%.

The number of workers are 1494. The occupations of the village are farming and animal husbandry. People predominantly speak Telugu.

As per Panchyati Raaj Act, village is administrated by Sarpanch who is elected representative of village.vijay kalluri

References

External links
Gandipalem census 2011
Indian government irrigation project plan
Udaygiri taluk
 Gandipalem project

Villages in Nellore district